Eleonore Caburet (born 2 February 2004) is a French rhythmic gymnast, member of the French national group.

Personal life 
Caburet took up rhythmic gymnastics at age six, she was initially interested in dance as her mother worked as a dance teacher, as she was getting bored of it her sister showed her a video of a Russian gymnast and she fell in love with the sport. Her ambition is to be part of the French group that will compete at the Olympic Games 2024 in Paris. Her favourite apparatuses are ball and clubs. Outside the sporting hall her hobbies are drawing, painting and reading. She plans to study law or political sciences, she speaks French, English and Spanish.

Career 
Eleonore was included into the national senior group in 2019, she now trains for 40 hours per week at the National Institute for Sport, Expertise and Performance [INSEP] in Paris.

She made it to the starting five in 2022, debuting at the World Cup in Athens where the group won All-Around gold. One month later, in April, they won bronze in both the All-Around and 5 hoops in Sofia. In June Eleonore and the group travelled to Pesaro, being 6th in the All-Around and 4th with 5 hoops. Ten days later she competed at the 2022 European Championships in Tel Aviv, where France was 6th in the All-Around, 7th in the 5 hoops final and 5th in the 3 ribbons + 2 balls' one. In September Caburet made her World Championships debut in Sofia along Emma Delaine, Ainhoa Dot, Manelle Inaho, Ashley Julien, Lozea Vilarino and the two individuals Hélène Karbanov and Maelle Millet, taking 11th place in the All-Around.

References 

2004 births
Living people
French rhythmic gymnasts
21st-century French women
People from Rennes